The Elections (Hours of Poll) Act 1885 (48 & 49 Vict. c. 10) was an Act of the Parliament of the United Kingdom. It became law on 28 April 1885.

It provided that at every parliamentary election and municipal election, the poll was to remain open from 8 o'clock a.m. to 8 o'clock p.m. It did not apply in places where no poll was held, or in elections to University constituencies. It repealed the Elections (Hours of Poll) Act 1884, and went into force at the end of the enacting Parliament, meaning it first applied for the 1885 United Kingdom general election.

References
Oliver & Boyd's new Edinburgh almanac and national repository for the year 1886. Oliver & Boyd, Edinburgh, 1886

United Kingdom Acts of Parliament 1885
1885 in British law
Election law in the United Kingdom
Election legislation